In mathematical logic, a conservative extension is a supertheory of a theory which is often convenient for proving theorems, but proves no new theorems about the language of the original theory. Similarly, a non-conservative extension is a supertheory which is not conservative, and can prove more theorems than the original.

Note that a conservative extension of a consistent theory is consistent. Hence, conservative extensions do not bear the risk of introducing new inconsistencies.

Recently, conservative extensions have been used for defining a notion of module for ontologies: if an ontology is formalized as a logical theory, a subtheory is a module if the whole ontology is a conservative extension of the subtheory.

An extension which is not conservative may be called a proper extension.

Examples
 ACA0, a subsystem of second-order arithmetic studied in reverse mathematics, is a conservative extension of first-order Peano arithmetic.
 Von Neumann–Bernays–Gödel set theory (NBG) is a conservative extension of Zermelo–Fraenkel set theory with the axiom of choice (ZFC).
 Internal set theory is a conservative extension of Zermelo–Fraenkel set theory with the axiom of choice (ZFC).
 Extensions by definitions are conservative.
 Extensions by unconstrained predicate or function symbols are conservative.
 IΣ1 (a subsystem of Peano arithmetic with induction only for Σ01-formulas) is a Π02-conservative extension of the primitive recursive arithmetic (PRA).
 ZFC is a Σ13-conservative extension of ZF by Shoenfield's absoluteness theorem.
 ZFC with the continuum hypothesis is a Π21-conservative extension of ZFC.

Model-theoretic conservative extension

Each model-theoretic conservative extension also is a (proof-theoretic) conservative extension in the above sense. The model theoretic notion has the advantage over the proof theoretic one that it does not depend so much on the language at hand; on the other hand, it is usually harder to establish model theoretic conservativity.

See also
 Extension by definitions
 Extension by new constant and function names

References

External links

 The importance of conservative extensions for the foundations of mathematics

Mathematical logic
Model theory
Proof theory